Sir Ronald Ross Institute of Tropical and Communicable Diseases, also known as Fever Hospital, is a hospital in Nallakunta, India, which treats diseases such as diphtheria, diarrhea, measles, mumps, cholera, and hepatitis. The hospital is affiliated with Osmania Medical College.

See also
Sir Ronald Ross Institute of Parasitology

References

Hospitals in Hyderabad, India
Fever hospitals